João Afonso Paula da Silva (born 1 February 1998) is a Portuguese professional footballer who plays as a defender.

Football career
On 27 October 2018, Silva made his professional debut with Trapani in a 2018–19 Serie C match against Cavese.

On 29 January 2020, he signed with Serie C club Bisceglie.

References

External links

1998 births
Living people
Sportspeople from Coimbra
Portuguese footballers
Association football defenders
Serie B players
Serie C players
Trapani Calcio players
A.S. Bisceglie Calcio 1913 players
Portugal youth international footballers
Portuguese expatriate footballers
Expatriate footballers in Italy